Leo Sargent Markham (born 22 March 1953) is an English former professional footballer who played in the Football League, as a defender.

References

Aylesbury stats at Aylesbury United

1953 births
Living people
People from Leytonstone
English footballers
Association football defenders
Watford F.C. players
Wimbledon F.C. players
Bedford Town F.C. players
Aylesbury United F.C. players
English Football League players
Marlow F.C. players